Hooker Field is a stadium in Martinsville, Virginia.  It is primarily used for baseball and is the home of the Martinsville Mustangs of the Coastal Plain League and the Patrick & Henry Community College Patriots. The ballpark has a capacity of 3,200 people. It opened in 1988 and was the home field of the Appalachian League Martinsville Phillies from 1988 through 1998 and the Martinsville Astros from 1999 to 2003.

References

External links
Ball Parks of the Minor Leagues: Hooker Field
Martinsville Mustangs: Hooker Field
Charlie's Ballparks: Hooker Field
Ballpark Reviews: Hooker Field
Minor League Ballparks: Hooker Field
Virginia.org: Hooker Field
 News reports:

Baseball venues in Virginia
Minor league baseball venues
Buildings and structures in Martinsville, Virginia
1988 establishments in Virginia
Sports venues completed in 1988